Augustin Semler, also known as Gustav Semler or Szemes Gusztáv, was a Romanian international footballer. He had two spells at defunct club Chinezul Timișoara, and also played for French side Montpellier HSC. He was also part of Romania's squad for the football tournament at the 1924 Summer Olympics, but he did not play in any matches.

Career statistics

Club

Notes

International

International goals
Scores and results list Romania's goal tally first.

Honours
Chinezul Timișoara
Liga I (4): 1923–24, 1924–25, 1925–26, 1926–27
Bocskai Debrecen
Hungarian Cup (1): 1929–30

References

External links
 
 

Romanian footballers
Romania international footballers
Olympic footballers of Romania
Footballers at the 1924 Summer Olympics
Association football forwards
Liga I players
FC Ripensia Timișoara players
Ligue 1 players
Montpellier HSC players
Romanian expatriate footballers
Romanian expatriate sportspeople in Hungary
Expatriate footballers in Hungary
Romanian expatriate sportspeople in France
Expatriate footballers in France
Year of birth missing